Adam Wieczorek (born February 5, 1992) is a Polish mixed martial artist who competes in the Heavyweight division. He formerly competed in  the Ultimate Fighting Championship.

Mixed martial arts career

Early career

Pessoa fought mostly in Poland for PLMMA promotion, amassing an undefeated 8–1 record while also winning the PLMMA Heavyweight Championship.

Ultimate Fighting Championship

In his UFC debut, Wieczorek was expected to face Dmitrii Smolyakov on October 21, 2017, at UFC Fight Night: Cerrone vs. Till, however Dmitrii had to pull out and was replaced by UFC veteran Anthony Hamilton. However, the bout was scratched a day before the event due to "safety concerns," as a few Lechia Gdańsk ultras – extreme and sometimes violent supporters of the local football team – showed up just prior to the weigh-ins. Wieczorek is a supporter of Ruch Chorzów, a Lechia Gdańsk rival team. The fighters were absent from ceremonial weigh-ins due to that reason, but the bout was eventually canceled and rescheduled for UFC Fight Night: Werdum vs. Tybura a month later. Wieczorek won the bout by unanimous decision.

Wieczorek's next fight was against Arjan Bhullar on April 14, 2018, at UFC on Fox 29. After Bhullar controlled the first round with his wrestling, Wieczorek would eventually catch Bhullar with an omoplata early in the second round, officially winning the fight via submission at 1:59 of round 2.

Wieczorek was a late replacement for Ruslan Magomedov against Marcos Rogério de Lima on November 3, 2018, at UFC 230. He lost the fight via unanimous decision.

On January 29, 2019, Wieczorek, an avowed supporter of Ruch Chorzów soccer team, was arrested by the Polish police among the 10 suspects of group of football hooligans named of "Psycho Fans", associated with the football team Ruch Chorzow's fan movement, during a raid by anti-terrorism forces accused of alleged participation in organized crime, kidnapping, drug trafficking, assault, and robbery.

Post UFC 
Making his first appearance after being released from jail, Wieczorek was scheduled to face Szymon Bajor at FEN 37 on November 27, 2021, for the FEN Interim Heavyweight Championship. However, Wieczorek picked up an injury and had to pull out of the bout.

Wieczorek finally made his return to MMA after almost 4 years away, winning against Oli Thompson on September 24, 2022 at MMA Attack 4, finishing him via TKO stoppage in the third round.

Championships and accomplishments

Mixed martial arts
Ultimate Fighting Championship
Performance of the Night (One time) vs. Arjan Bhullar

Mixed martial arts record

|-
|Win
|align=center|11–2
|Oli Thompson
|TKO (punches)
|MMA Attack 4
|
|align=center| 3
|align=center| 2:13
|Będzin, Poland
|
|-
|Loss
|align=center|10–2
|Marcos Rogério de Lima
|Decision (unanimous)
|UFC 230 
|
|align=center|3
|align=center|5:00
|New York City, New York, United States
|
|-
| Win
| align=center| 10–1
| Arjan Bhullar
|Submission (omoplata)
|UFC on Fox: Poirier vs. Gaethje
|
|align=center|2
|align=center|1:59
|Glendale, Arizona, United States
|
|-
| Win
| align=center| 9–1
| Anthony Hamilton
|Decision (unanimous)
|UFC Fight Night: Werdum vs. Tybura
|
|align=center|3
|align=center|5:00
|Sydney, Australia
| 
|-
| Win
| align=center| 8–1
| Ernesto Papa
| Submission (rear-naked choke)
| Spartan Fight 5
| 
| align=center| 1
| align=center| N/A
| Kraków, Poland
| 
|-
| Win
| align=center| 7–1
| Zoumana Cisse
| TKO (punches)
| PLMMA 67: Nastula Cup 1
| 
| align=center| 1
| align=center| 5:06
| Łomianki, Poland
| 
|-
| Win
| align=center| 6–1
| Kevin Wiwatowski
| Submission (armbar)
| PLMMA 61: AFC 5
| 
| align=center| 3
| align=center| 3:25
| Bytom, Poland
| 
|-
| Win
| align=center| 5–1
| Filip Toe
| TKO (punches)
| PLMMA 56: Veto
| 
| align=center| 1
| align=center| 3:54
| Bielsko-Biała, Poland
| 
|-
| Win
| align=center| 4–1
| Bartosz Jabłoński
| Submission (armbar)
| PLMMA 51: Kalisz
| 
| align=center| 1
| align=center| 1:48
| Kalisz, Poland
| 
|-
| Win
| align=center| 3–1
| Andrzej Deberny
| Submission (armbar)
| Fighters Arena 10
| 
| align=center| 1
| align=center| 1:40
| Bełchatów, Poland
| 
|-
| Win
| align=center| 2–1
| Ryszard Raszkiewicz
| TKO (punches)
| MMA Challengers 9
| 
| align=center| 2
| align=center| 3:53
| Katowice, Poland
| 
|-
| Loss
| align=center| 1–1
| Marcin Tybura
| Decision (unanimous)
| Polish MMA Championships Finals
| 
| align=center| 2
| align=center| 5:00
| Chorzow, Poland
| 
|-
| Win
| align=center| 1–0
| Adam Bizon
| Submission (armbar)
| Polish MMA Championships Finals
| 
| align=center| 1
| align=center| 2:23
| Chorzow, Poland
|

See also 
 List of current UFC fighters
 List of male mixed martial artists

References

External links 
  
 

Living people
Polish male mixed martial artists
1992 births
Heavyweight mixed martial artists
Mixed martial artists utilizing wrestling
Mixed martial artists utilizing Brazilian jiu-jitsu
Ultimate Fighting Championship male fighters
Polish practitioners of Brazilian jiu-jitsu
Sportspeople from Chorzów